Philip Merivale (2 November 1886 – 12 March 1946) was an English film and stage actor and screenwriter.

Life and career
Merivale was born in Rehutia, Manickpur, India, to railway engineer Walter Merivale (1855–1902) and Emma Magdalene Merivale ("Maggie"; née Pittman; 1854–1940); his father's profession meant the family lived in India, Costa Rica, and Barbados (where he was Manager of the Barbados Railway) before settling at Chiswick. Philip's sister, Dorothea, was married to the civil servant Sir Henry Bunbury, Accountant-General of the Post Office.

Merivale was a respected stage actor who entered the cinema during the silent era. Merivale appeared in twenty films and also scripted one. He died from a heart ailment aged 59.

He was twice married to:
 the actress Viva Birkett (23 July 1912 – 27 June 1934); (four children: two daughters and two sons, including the actor John Merivale)
 the actress Gladys Cooper (30 April 1937 – 12 March 1946).

Broadway roles

 Pygmalion (1914) – Henry Higgins
 Pollyanna (1916) – Pendleton
 Mary of Scotland (1933) – James Hepburn, 4th Earl of Bothwell
 Valley Forge (1934) – George Washington

Filmography 
Trilby (1914) – Taffy Wynne
Whispering Shadows (1921) – Stephen Pryde
I Loved You Wednesday (1933) – (uncredited)
Give Us This Night (1936) – Marcello Bonelli
All In (1936, Writer)
Mr. & Mrs. Smith (1941) – Mr. Ashley Custer
Rage in Heaven (1941) – Mr. Higgins
Pacific Blackout (1941) – John Runnel
Lady for a Night (1942) – Stephen Alderson
This Above All (1942) – Dr. Roger Cathaway
Crossroads (1942) – Commissaire
Hangmen Also Die! (1943) – Policeman (uncredited)
This Land Is Mine (1943) – Professor Sorel
Lost Angel (1943) – Professor Peter Vincent
The Hour Before the Dawn (1944) – Sir Leslie Buchanon
Nothing But Trouble (1944) – Prince Saul
Tonight and Every Night (1945) – Reverend Gerald Lundy
Adventure (1945) – Old Ramon Estado
The Stranger (1946) – Judge Adam Longstreet
Sister Kenny (1946) – Dr. Brack (final film role)

References

External links

 
 
 

1886 births
1946 deaths
English male film actors
English male stage actors
English male screenwriters
British people in colonial India
People from Thane district
20th-century English male actors
British expatriate male actors in the United States
20th-century English screenwriters
20th-century English male writers